Robert Jones (28 March 1933 – 1998) was an English professional footballer who played as a goalkeeper. He played in The Football League for Southport, Chester and Blackburn Rovers.

Playing career
Jones played football as a youngster for the Meols Cop School team, the Southport town boys side and the Boys' Brigade. He then joined Football League side Southport, where his father was club trainer. In the summer of 1953 he moved to Chester, going on to be a league ever present in his first season at the club.

He remained a part-time player throughout his stay at Chester as he earned more in his work as a structural engineer. In March 1958 Jones moved to Blackburn Rovers for £3,000, going on to play top flight football over the next eight years.

Jones was released by Blackburn Rovers in 1966 and he dropped into non–league football with Great Harwood Town, where he would have spells as player, trainer and manager until 1977. Away from football he ran his own design business Jones Wilkinson Construction Services along with lifelong Friend Ken Wilkinson until retiring in 1985 on health grounds. He died in 1998.

References

1933 births
1998 deaths
English footballers
Association football goalkeepers
English Football League players
Southport F.C. players
Chester City F.C. players
Blackburn Rovers F.C. players
English football managers
Structural engineers
Footballers from Liverpool
Great Harwood Town F.C. players
Date of death missing